Daniel J. DeSantis (September 21, 1918 – December 28, 2004) was an American football running back in the National Football League for the Philadelphia Eagles and in the Canadian Football League for the Hamilton Tiger-Cats.  He was also a lieutenant colonel in the United States Air Force.

Career
DeSantis was a prominent athlete known both locally and nationally.  While in high school, he earned all city honors in both football and basketball at the former Trott Vocational High School.  At Niagara University, he played football as a halfback and was named to the all-star team of the Little Three Conference, the All East Squad and also earned All American honorable mention in 1940.  He also played American Legion, Muny League, and Industrial League baseball as well.  DeSantis went on to play professional football with the Philadelphia Eagles from 1941 until 1946 and would later become the first NFL player to play in the Canadian Football League when he joined the Hamilton Tiger-Cats in 1947.

Personal life
DeSantis was born in Niagara Falls, New York.  He graduated from Niagara Falls High School in 1937.  He graduated from Niagara University with a bachelor's degree in accounting in 1941.  He served in the United States Army during the second World War as a captain with the 4032nd Army Air Force Base Unit, from March 16, 1942 until his honorable discharge on April 1, 1946.  He later actively served as major with the U.S. Air Force during the Korean War, from April 16, 1951 until his honorable discharge on September 15, 1952.  After that, he continued serving in the U.S. Air Force Reserves until his honorable discharge as a lieutenant colonel on July 7, 1969.  For twenty-five years, he was employed as a traffic coordinator at Kimberly Clark  in Niagara Falls, New York.

References

Pro-Football Reference
 "Dan DeSantis Athletic Career, Photos, Articles, and Videos | Fanbase." Fanbase | The Web's Largest Almanac of Pro and College Athletes, Built by Fans. Web. 31 May 2010. <https://archive.today/20130122231822/http://www.fanbase.com/Dan-DeSantis>.
 "Dan DeSantis: Career Stats." NFL.com - Official Site of the National Football League. Web. 31 May 2010. <http://www.nfl.com/players/dandesantis/careerstats?id=DES166116>.
 "Hall of Fame - PurpleEagles.com." The Official Home Page of Niagara University Athletics - PurpleEagles.com. Web. 31 May 2010. <https://web.archive.org/web/20090622141115/http://www.purpleeagles.com/halloffame/inductees/DanielJDeSantis.asp>.
 "Niagara Falls NY - Things to Do in Niagara Falls New York." Niagara Falls Canada and Niagara New York Tourist Guide. Web. 31 May 2010. <https://web.archive.org/web/20100406040146/http://www.niagara-falls-tourist-guide.com/niagara-falls-ny.html>.
 "Obituaries." Niagara Gazette [Niagara Falls, New York] 30 December 2004. Print.
 "Philadelphia Eagles Stats." NFL.com - Official Site of the National Football League. Web. 31 May 2010. <http://www.nfl.com/teams/statistics?season=1941&team=PHI&seasonType=>.

1918 births
2004 deaths
Niagara Purple Eagles football players
Philadelphia Eagles players
Hamilton Tiger-Cats players
Players of American football from New York (state)
Sportspeople from Niagara Falls, New York
United States Army Air Forces personnel of World War II
United States Army Air Forces officers
United States Air Force personnel of the Korean War
United States Air Force colonels